Anne Conway may refer to:

Anne Seymour Damer (1748–1828), née Conway, English sculptor
Anne C. Conway (born 1950), US federal judge
Anne Conway (philosopher) (1631–1679), English philosopher
Anna Conway (born 1973), American visual artist